Baldy Mountain is a peak of the Sangre de Cristo Mountains of New Mexico.

See also 
 Carson National Forest

References 

Mountains of New Mexico
Landforms of Taos County, New Mexico
Mountains of Taos County, New Mexico